Poldi Dur (1917–1996) was an Austrian dancer and stage actress. She also appeared in several films. She was born in Vienna as Elisabeth Handl.

Dur married the Austrian writer Walter Reisch. Following the 1938 Anchluss they emigrated to the United States.

Selected filmography

References

Bibliography
 Thomas S. Hischak. American Plays and Musicals on Screen: 650 Stage Productions and Their Film and Television Adaptations. McFarland & Company, 2005.

External links

1917 births
1996 deaths
Austrian film actresses
Austrian stage actresses
Austrian female dancers
Dancers from Vienna
Actresses from Vienna
Austrian emigrants to the United States